Cincinnati is a city in the U.S. state of Ohio.

Cincinnati may also refer to:

 Cincinnati, Arkansas
 Cincinnati, Indiana
 Cincinnati, Parke County, Indiana
 Cincinnati, Iowa
 Cincinnati, Missouri
 Cincinnati (horse), Ulysses S. Grant's most famous horse during the American Civil War
 Cincinnati (magazine), a monthly lifestyle magazine in Cincinnati, Ohio
 "Cincinnati" (Harsh Realm), an episode of Harsh Realm
 "Cincinnati, Ohio" (song), a 1967 country music song by Connie Smith
 USS Cincinnati

See also 

 Cincinnatus, Roman dictator for whom all of the above are named, directly or indirectly
 Greater Cincinnati or the Cincinnati/Northern Kentucky metropolitan area
 Cincinnatian Series, a biostratigraphic rock layer dating from the upper Ordovician system that is exposed in southwestern Ohio, southeastern Indiana and northern Kentucky
 Cincinnatian, a passenger train
 Eola, Oregon, named Cincinnati from 1849 to 1856
 Society of the Cincinnati, a historical organization founded to preserve the ideals of American Revolutionary War officers
 1373 Cincinnati, an asteroid in the Main belt
 The Cincinnati Kid
 Cincinnatia
 University of Cincinnati
 Cincinnati Bearcats athletic teams representing the university